Golden Eagle (or Golden Eagle) is a 1970 Thai action film starring Mitr Chaibancha and Petchara Chaowarat. Chaibancha died while filming the stunt for the final scene in the film.

Plot
Rom Ritthikrai (Mitr Chaibancha) is at a nightclub getting very drunk and trying to persuade others to join him in his fun. He is retrieved by his faithful assistant Oy (Petchara Chaowarat). Rom is actually the masked crimefighter, Insee Daeng, or Red Eagle, and he uses the persona as a fun-loving drunkard as a cover.

However, an impostor Insee Daeng (Kanchit Kwanpracha) is committing murders, so Rom must change his masked alias to another color, and he becomes the Golden Eagle, or Insee Tong.

The impostor Red Eagle is connected to the Red Bamboo gang, which is trying to seize control of the Thai government. Red Bamboo is led by Bakin (Ob Boontid), who was trained in hypnotism by Rasputin and is able to kill his intended targets by beaming his thoughts and visage through red ceramic Buddha statues, which are being delivered to various Thai officials. Bakin can also split himself into three images, making it impossible for gunmen to shoot him.

Disguised as Golden Eagle, Rom sneaks into the Red Bamboo gang's house and discovers that the daughter of an admiral is being held hostage.

A police detective, meanwhile, is investigating his own angle on the case, going undercover as a transvestite to infiltrate a ring of transvestite criminals who are in league with the Red Bamboo gang. A case of mistaken identities causes the policeman and Golden Eagle to get into a fight.

The plot comes to a climax on an island in the Gulf of Thailand, with the police racing in on boats to attack a Red Bamboo stronghold.

The mission accomplished, the Golden Eagle takes hold of a rope ladder on a helicopter and is carried aloft and into the sunset, in true action hero style.

Remake
In 2010, a remake of this film named The Red Eagle was directed by Wisit Sasanatieng.

Production and Mitr's death
Insee Thong was the first film that Mitr produced himself, and it featured the return of his popular character, the masked crime-fighter, Insee Daeng (Red Eagle), the secret alter ego of detective Rom Rittikrai.

On the last day of shooting, the script called for Mitr to fly off into the sunset in a helicopter. As the camera rolled, Mitr leapt from the ground to grab the rope ladder hanging from the aircraft. The helicopter flew higher and higher and Mitr lost his grip and fell to his death. The accident was all caught on camera and was actually left in the final theatrical release. The fatal drop has since been removed from DVD versions of the film, with Mitr simply flying off into the distance, and some text onscreen, paying tribute to the star.

Mitr's death was ruled as an accident. For safety, there should have been two shots for that final scene. The first would be of Mitr grabbing the ladder and flying off at low altitude. Then, a stunt double would have performed the second shot at higher altitude.

DVD release
Insee tong was released on DVD in Thailand in 2005. The English-subtitled DVD contains a music video, photo gallery and footage from the cremation ceremony of Mitr Chaibancha.

References

External links
 
 Insee tong at HKflix

1970 films
Thai-language films
1970s action films
1970 LGBT-related films
Thai LGBT-related films
Transgender-related films
Thai national heritage films
Thai action films